Zbójno  is a village in Golub-Dobrzyń County, Kuyavian-Pomeranian Voivodeship, in north-central Poland. It is the seat of the gmina (administrative district) called Gmina Zbójno.

The village has a population of 841.

References

Villages in Golub-Dobrzyń County